was a fighter aircraft unit of the Imperial Japanese Navy (IJN) during the Pacific campaign of World War II.  The unit was formed on 1 November 1942 by separating the fighter squadron from the Genzan Air Group.

The unit, equipped with A6M Zero fighter aircraft, was involved in several major battles in the south and central Pacific from 1942 to 1943, including the Battle of the Bismarck Sea.

After being annihilated in combat over the Marshall Islands in 1943, the unit was reconstituted in Japan in February 1944 and helped defending the home islands against Allied offensives, including B-29 bomber attacks from the Mariana Islands.

References

Groups of the Imperial Japanese Navy Air Service
Military units and formations established in 1942
Military units and formations disestablished in 1945